WLCI-LP (97.5 FM) is a campus radio station licensed to Nelsonville, Ohio, United States. The station is currently owned by Hocking Technical College. WLCI-LP is a student-run station, based out of the Hocking College School of Music in Southeast Ohio. The station is operated entirely by students in the Hocking College School of Music Program.

The license was cancelled on October 2, 2020, for failure to file a license renewal, but was reinstated on October 6, 2020, upon the Federal Communications Commission receiving the renewal application.

References

External links
 

LCI-LP
LCI-LP
LCI-LP